In mathematics, the Moy–Prasad  filtration is a family of filtrations of p-adic reductive groups and their Lie algebras, named after Allen Moy and Gopal Prasad. The family is parameterized by the Bruhat–Tits building; that is, each point of the building gives a different filtration. Alternatively, since the initial term in each filtration at a point of the building is the parahoric subgroup for that point, the Moy–Prasad  filtration can be viewed as a filtration of a parahoric subgroup of a reductive group.

The chief application of the Moy–Prasad  filtration is to the representation theory of p-adic groups, where it can be used to define a certain real number called the depth of a representation. The representations of depth r can be better understood by studying the rth Moy–Prasad  subgroups. This information then leads to a better understanding of the overall structure of the representations, and that understanding in turn has applications to other areas of mathematics, such as number theory via the Langlands program.

History
In their foundational work on the theory of buildings, Bruhat and Tits defined subgroups associated to concave functions of the root system. These subgroups are a special case of the Moy–Prasad  subgroups, defined when the group is split. The main innovations of Moy and Prasad were to generalize Bruhat–Tits's construction to quasi-split groups, in particular tori, and to use the subgroups to study the representation theory of the ambient group.

Examples
The following examples use the p-adic rational numbers  and the p-adic integers .

Multiplicative group 
Since  is abelian, it has a unique parahoric subgroup,  .

General linear group 
Another important example of a p-adic reductive group is the general linear group ; this example generalizes the previous one because . Since  is nonabelian (when ), it has infinitely many parahoric subgroups.

Properties
Although the Moy–Prasad  filtration is commonly used to study the representation theory of p-adic groups, one can construct Moy–Prasad  subgroups over any Henselian, discretely valued field , not just over a nonarchimedean local field. In this and subsequent sections, we will therefore assume that the base field  is Henselian and discretely valued, and with ring of integers . Nonetheless, the reader is welcome to assume for simplicity that , so that .

(In fact, the Lie algebra  can also be defined when , though the group  cannot.)

The Moy–Prasad  filtration satisfies the following additional properties.

A jump in the Moy–Prasad  filtration is defined as an index (that is, nonnegative real number)  such that . The set of jumps is discrete and countably infinite.
In particular, if  is a nonarchimedean local field (such as ) then this quotient is a finite group of Lie type.
 For any uniformizer  of  we have .

By the commutator subgroup property, the quotient  is abelian if . In this case there is a canonical isomorphism , called the Moy–Prasad  isomorphism. The technical assumption needed for the Moy–Prasad  isomorphism to exist is that  be tame, meaning that  splits over a tamely ramified extension of the base field .

Depth of a representation

In a sequel to the paper defining their filtration, Moy and Prasad proved a structure theorem for depth-zero supercuspidal representations. The quotient  is a finite group of Lie type. Let  be an irreducible representation of  whose restriction to  contains  as a subrepresentation. Moreover, every depth-zero supercuspidal representation is isomorphic to one of this form.

In the tame case, the local Langlands correspondence is expected to preserve depth, where the depth of an L-parameter is defined using the upper numbering filtration on the Weil group.

Construction

Our description of the construction follows Yu's article on smooth models.

Tori
Since algebraic tori are a particular class of reductive groups, the theory of the Moy–Prasad  filtration applies to them as well. It turns out, however, that the construction of the Moy–Prasad  subgroups for a general reductive group relies on the construction for tori, so we begin by discussing the case where  is a torus.

A torus is said to be induced if it is the direct product of finitely many tori of the form considered in the previous paragraph. The th Moy–Prasad  subgroup of an induced torus is defined as the product of the th Moy–Prasad  subgroup of these factors.

Second, consider the case where  but  is an arbitrary torus. This definition agrees with the previously given one when  is an induced torus.

It turns out that every torus can be embedded in an induced torus. This construction is independent of the choice of induced torus and embedding.

Reductive groups
For simplicity, we will first outline the construction of the Moy–Prasad  subgroup  in the case where  is split. After, we will comment on the general definition.

The point  determines, for each root , an additive valuation . We define .

If  is not split, then the Moy–Prasad  subgroup  is defined by unramified descent from the quasi-split case, a standard trick in Bruhat–Tits theory. More specifically, one first generalizes the definition of the Moy–Prasad  subgroups given above, which applies when  is split, to the case where  is only quasi-split, using the relative root system.

Group schemes
The -group  carries much more structure than the group  of rational points: the former is an algebraic variety whereas the second is only an abstract group. For this reason, there are many technical advantages to working not only with the abstract group , but also the variety . In fact, it is possible to construct such a group scheme .

Lie algebras
When , it turns out that  is just the Lie algebra of the -group scheme .

Indexing set
We have defined the Moy–Prasad  filtration at the point  to be indexed by the set  of real numbers.

See also
 Congruence subgroup

Citations

References

 

 

Representation theory of algebraic groups